Fang Ridge is a conspicuous ridge on the northeast slope of Mount Erebus, on Ross Island, Antarctica. It is a much denuded portion of the original caldera rim left by a catastrophic eruption. It was so named, probably for its curved shape, by Frank Debenham of the British Antarctic Expedition, 1910–13, who made a plane table survey in 1912.

References 

Ridges of Ross Island